Morten Jørgensen (born 23 June 1985) is a Danish lightweight rower. He won a gold medal at the 2008 Summer Olympics in Lightweight coxless fours together with Thomas Ebert, Eskild Ebbesen, and Mads Andersen.

Morten Jørgensen was a substitute for the crew, the Gold Four, going into the 2008 Summer Olympics. One and a half months before the event he substituted for Bo Helleberg who was injured. The Danish team went on to win the gold medal. Four years later at the 2012 Summer Olympics, Jørgensen was again part of the Danish lightweight men's four team, but this time they could only finish third, winning the bronze medal.

References

1985 births
Living people
Danish male rowers
Olympic rowers of Denmark
Rowers at the 2008 Summer Olympics
Rowers at the 2012 Summer Olympics
Rowers at the 2016 Summer Olympics
Olympic gold medalists for Denmark
Olympic silver medalists for Denmark
Olympic bronze medalists for Denmark
Olympic medalists in rowing
Medalists at the 2012 Summer Olympics
Medalists at the 2008 Summer Olympics
Medalists at the 2016 Summer Olympics
World Rowing Championships medalists for Denmark
European Rowing Championships medalists